A land terrier is a record system for an institution's land and property holdings. It differs from a land register in that it is maintained for the organisation's own needs and may not be publicly accessible.

Typically, it consists of written records related to a map. Modern practice involves the use of Geographic Information Systems.

In France the term "terrier" refers to feudal records associated with the Ancien Régime.

See also
Manorial roll
Urbarium

References
R P Croom-Johnson and G F L Bridgman. Taylor on Evidence. Twelfth Edition. 1931. Section 622 at page 1772.
"Ancient terriers, maps, etc". Archbold Criminal Pleading, Evidence and Practice, 1999 Edition, paragraph 9–44 at pages 1095 to 1096.
Thomas Starkie. "Terrier". A Practical Treatise of the Law of Evidence, and Digest of Proofs, in Civil and Criminal Proceedings. Third Edition. V and R Stevens and G S Norton. London. A Milliken. Dublin. 1842. Volume 1. Pages 238 to 241 and 251. Volume 2. Pages 1090 and 1091.
Robert Joseph Pothier. Translated by William David Evans. A Treatise on the Law of Obligations, or Contracts. Second American Edition. Robert H Small. Minor Street, Philadelphia. 1839. Volume 2. Page 125.
Samuel March Phillipps and Thomas James Arnold. "Terriers". A Treatise on the Law of Evidence. Tenth English Edition. Fourth American Edition. With notes by Cowen and Hill. By Isaac Edwards. Banks and Brothers. New York. 1859. Volume 2. Page 292 et seq.
Mark Bailey. The English Manor c 1200 to c 1500. Manchester University Press. Manchester and New York. 2002. Pages 18, 21, 42, 75, 76, 79.

Property management
Land tenure